Harry Sullivan may refer to:

 Harry Sullivan (Doctor Who), fictional character in the British SF series Doctor Who
 Harry Stack Sullivan (1892–1949), American psychologist and psychoanalyst
 Harry Sullivan (baseball) (1888–1919), American pitcher
 Harry Sullivan (footballer) (1932–2017), Australian rules footballer
 Harry Sullivan (politician) (1921–1977), Australian politician

See also
 Henry Sullivan (disambiguation)